The Great Britain national rugby sevens team is the men's international rugby 7s team that is the representative team of Great Britain. After having played at the World Games in 2001 and 2005, they made their Olympic debut at the 2016 Summer Olympics, where they won the silver medal, losing the final to Fiji.

Olympic history
When rugby sevens was admitted to the Summer Olympics in 2009, it was not initially known how Great Britain could qualify. As the three nations that make up Great Britain, England, Wales and Scotland, all compete separately in international competition, it was suggested that if any of them gained a qualifying spot then Great Britain would qualify. However, the International Olympic Committee (IOC) and the International Rugby Board (IRB), stated that Great Britain must select a lead nation to be the only one able to gain the qualification spot. The individual British rugby unions selected England to be the lead nation as the Rugby Football Union was the only British union to fund a full-time rugby sevens programme. England secured Great Britain's qualification to the 2016 Summer Olympics by finishing fourth in the 2015 Sevens World Series.

Wales rugby sevens winger Lloyd Lewis has said that the decision to combine three nations to form GB sevens teams will limit players' opportunities. He added that a GB team means that there will be more competition for places and less availability for Welsh players.

Eligibility
While England was the team that qualified Great Britain for the 2016 Olympics, the Great Britain national rugby sevens team is able to select players from Wales and Scotland as well as England similar to the British and Irish Lions in rugby union. Northern Irish players according to the British Olympic Association's rules as British citizens would have been eligible to play for Great Britain; however the Irish Rugby Football Union (IRFU) announced that Northern Ireland players would represent the Ireland national rugby sevens team as rugby in Ireland is organised on an All-Ireland basis. However, it was stated that Northern Irish and Ulster contracted players could legally challenge that determination, particularly if Ireland failed to qualify.

Tournament history

World Games

Summer Olympic Games

A silver medal for Great Britain in the 2016 Olympics is a considerable achievement for a team that was only formed ten weeks prior the tournament. Where other teams on the sevens circuit had been preparing two years or longer, Team Great Britain coach Amor only got his players together for the first time on May 30. England, Wales and Scotland all compete as separate nations in the World Sevens Series.

Squads

Olympic Squads 
2016 Squad
2020 Squad

References

National rugby sevens teams
Great Britain at the Summer Olympics
R